Omar José Fleitas Castellano (born 6 December 1991), often known simply as Omar, is a Spanish footballer who plays for CD Mensajero as a midfielder.

Football career
Born in Fontanales, Moya, Las Palmas, Canary Islands, Omar graduated from UD Las Palmas' youth system. On 15 June 2008, while still a junior, he made his professional debut, coming on as a second-half substitute in a 1–3 away loss against Albacete Balompié in the Segunda División; at the age of 16 years and 206 days, he was the youngest player ever to debut for the club, surpassing Orlando Suárez's record.

Omar was assigned to the reserves in the Tercera División, for the 2010–11 season. In July 2013, after achieving promotion to the Segunda División B, he rejected a new deal from the club, and joined Atlético Granadilla also in the fourth level on 5 August.

In October 2013, however, Omar rescinded his link and moved to fellow league team UD Vecindario. On 22 January 2014 he left, and signed an 18-month deal with CF Fuenlabrada in the third level.

References

External links

1991 births
Living people
People from Gran Canaria
Sportspeople from the Province of Las Palmas
Spanish footballers
Footballers from the Canary Islands
Association football midfielders
Segunda División players
Segunda División B players
Tercera División players
UD Las Palmas players
UD Las Palmas Atlético players
UD Vecindario players
CD Mensajero players
CD Guijuelo footballers